The Raisin River is a river in South Stormont and South Glengarry, United Counties of Stormont, Dundas and Glengarry in eastern Ontario, Canada, with the watershed encompassing portions of North Stormont, North Glengarry and the city of Cornwall as well. It empties into Lake Saint Francis on the Saint Lawrence River near the community of Lancaster.

The river's name is an anglicised form of the earlier French settler name "la rivière aux Raisins", which referred to the wild grapes (raisins in French) that can still be found growing along the shores of the river.

Course
It travels south to the community of Bunker Hill, then turns east, and takes in the left tributaries Palen Creek, Shaver Drain and Wereley Creek near the community of North Lunenburg. The Raisin River continues east, takes in the left tributary Stoney Creek at the community of Black River, and passes under Ontario Highway 138 at the community of St. Andrews. It heads northeast, takes in the left tributary Beaver Creek and right tributary McIntosh Drain, then the left tributary North Raisin River at the community of Martintown. It heads east, passes into South Glengarry, takes in the right tributary Glen Falloch Drain and left tributary McIntyre Creek, then reaches the community of Williamstown and the right tributary South Raisin River. The river continues east, takes in the right tributary Glen Drain, passes under Ontario Highway 401, and reaches Lake Saint Francis.

Recreation
The "Great Raisin Raisin River Foot Race" is held in Williamstown. In spring, the "Raisin River Canoe Race" runs from Saint Andrews to Williamstown.

Tributaries
Glen Drain (right)
South Raisin River (right)
McIntyre Creek (left)
Glen Falloch Drain (right)
North Raisin River (left)
McIntosh Drain (right)
Beaver Creek (left)
Stoney Creek (left)
Wereley Creek (left)
Shaver Drain (left)
Palen Creek (left)

See also
List of rivers of Ontario

References

Sources

External links

 Raisin Region Conservation Authority

Rivers of the United Counties of Stormont, Dundas and Glengarry
Tributaries of the Saint Lawrence River